Archembiidae is a family of webspinners in the order Embioptera. There are at least 2 genera and about 12 described species in Archembiidae.

Genera
These two genera belong to the family Archembiidae:
 Calamoclostes Enderlein, 1909
 † Archembia Ross, 1971

References

Further reading

 
 
 
 

Embioptera
Insect families